Paranaemia is a genus of lady beetles in the family Coccinellidae. There is one described species in Paranaemia, P. vittigera.

References

Further reading

 
 

Coccinellidae
Coccinellidae genera
Monotypic Cucujiformia genera
Articles created by Qbugbot